Hiett may refer to:

Hiett, Ohio
Hiett (surname)